The 2017 NASCAR K&N Pro Series East was the 31st season of the K&N Pro Series East, a regional stock car racing series sanctioned by NASCAR. It began with the Jet Tools 150 at New Smyrna Speedway on February 19 and concluded with the National Fallen Firefighters Foundation 125 presented by Carl Deputy & Son Builders at Dover International Speedway on September 29. Justin Haley was the defending Drivers' Champion. Harrison Burton won the championship, eight points in front of Todd Gilliland.

Drivers

Notes

Schedule
All of the races in the 2017 season - with the exception of the JustDrive.com 125 - were televised on NBCSN and were on a tape delay basis.

Notes

Results and Standings

Races

Notes
1 – The qualifying session for the Zombie Auto 125 was cancelled due to weather. The starting line-up was decided by Owners' championship.
2 – Starting grid was set by the fastest lap times from the first WhosYourDriver.org Twin 100 race.

Drivers' championship

(key) Bold – Pole position awarded by time. Italics – Pole position set by final practice results or Owners' points. * – Most laps led.

Notes
1 – J. P. Morgan got ill after Qualifying of the Jet Tools 150 and one hour before the race the team put Caleb Holman in the car.
2 – Woody Pitkat received championship points, despite the fact that he did not qualify for the race.
3 – Scored points towards the K&N Pro Series West.

See also

2017 Monster Energy NASCAR Cup Series
2017 NASCAR Xfinity Series
2017 NASCAR Camping World Truck Series
2017 NASCAR K&N Pro Series West
2017 NASCAR Whelen Modified Tour
2017 NASCAR Pinty's Series
2017 NASCAR PEAK Mexico Series
2017 NASCAR Whelen Euro Series

References